Thomas Thurston Garneys (25 August 1923 – 13 March 2007) was an English professional football centre forward who made over 240 appearances in the Football League for Ipswich Town. He scored 143 goals in a seven-year spell, which was cut short by a persistent back injury.

Personal life 
After his retirement from football, Garneys ran The Milestone pub (now known as The Mulberry Tree) in Ipswich. At the time of his death, he was living at a nursing home in Basildon.

Career statistics

References 

1923 births
2007 deaths
Ipswich Town F.C. players
People from Leytonstone
Notts County F.C. players
English Football League players
Chingford Town F.C. players
Brentford F.C. players
Southern Football League players
Association football forwards
Leytonstone F.C. players
English footballers